The  2nd Moscow Jewish Film Festival is an annual international film festival, which aims to gather in the program features, documentaries, shorts and animated films on the subject of Jewish culture, history and national identity and contemporary problems. The festival was held in Moscow from 14 to 21 June 2016, at the Jewish Museum and Tolerance Center, the Documentary film center, cinema GUM and KARO 11 cinema Oktyabr.

Opening film
Opening film of the festival was the directorial debut Natalie Portman A Tale of Love and Darkness. The opening ceremony was held in cinema Oktyabr which gathered about 1,600 spectators.

Jury 
 Alexander Boroda — Rabbi, President of the Federation of Jewish Communities of Russia
 Yekaterina Mtsituridze — television presenter, film critic and head of Roskino
 Sofya Kapkova — producer, cultural figure, director of the Documentary film center 
 Alexey Ageev — producer
 Alexander Mitta — film director, screenwriter
 Sergey Mokritskiy— film director, operator and scriptwriter

Creators
 CEO and producer — Egor Odintsov
 Program director — Vanya Bowden
 Educational director — Rusina Lekuh
 Producer — Konstantin Fam

Program

Main program
Nomination "To the memory":
 Closer to the Moon (2014) — Romania, United States, Italy, Poland, France
 Finding Babel (2016) — United States, France, Canada, Russia, Ukraine
 The Kozalchik Affair (2015) — Israel, Poland
 Because I was a Painter (2013) — France, Germany
 Fever at the Dawn (2015) — Hungary
 Phoenix — Germany, Poland
  Nomination "Context":
 The village of Peace (2014) — Israel, United States 
 Friends from France (2013) — Russia, France
 Jerusalem Boxing Club (2015) — Israel
 To Life! (2014) — France
 Die Geträumten (2016) — Austria
 A Tale of Love and Darkness (2015) — United States
 Brundibar Revisited (2014) — Germany, Czech Republic
 The Last Mentsch (2014) — Germany
 The Wandering Muse (2014) — Canada
  Nomination "Conflict":
 The Dybbuk. A Tale of Wandering Souls (2015) — Poland, Sweden, Ukraine, Israel
 Jewish cardinal (2013) — France
 Dough (2015) — United Kingdom, Hungary
 Beyond the fear (2015) — Israel, Latvia
  Nomination "A short story":
 Day 40 (2014) — Canada
 7 day Gig (2013) — United States
 Bacon and Gods Wrath (2015) — Canada
 Incognito (2015) — United Kingdom
 What Cheer? (2014) — United States 
 The Divorce (2014) — United Kingdom
 A good Joke (2005) — Canada
 What's in a Name? (2014) — United States

Out of competition
  Nomination "Retro":
 Lullaby (1986) — Poland, Switzerland
 Love (1991) — USSR
 Chopin Nocturne (1992) — Russia, United States  
 Protektor (2009) — Czech Republic, Germany
  Nomination "Special screenings":
 Battle for Sevastopol (2015) — Russia, Ukraine
 Vladimir Gorikker. Rare genre (2015) — Russia 
 Note (2012) — Russia 
 Son of Saul (2015) — Hungary

Education
In addition to film screenings educational program was organized in the framework of the festival, consisting of lectures, discussions and debates. The speakers were: director and screenwriter Oleg Dorman, creators The Dybbuk. A Tale of Wandering Souls - Krzysztof Kopczyński and Uri Gershovich, musicologist Layla Kandaurova, theologian and historian Yuri Tabak, film critic Valery Davydov, Alexander Bartosiewicz, Alexander Mitta, Lyudmila Ulitskaya, director Mariya Kravchenko, as well as the lead actor in the movie "Son of Saul" Géza Röhrig.

Winners
 Nomination "To the memory" — Phoenix (2014)
 Nomination "Context" — The Wandering Muse (2014)
 Nomination "Conflict" — The Dybbuk. A Tale of Wandering Souls (2015)
 Nomination "A short story" — The Divorce (2014) 
 Special Jury Prize — Finding Babel (2016)]
 Honorary Prize "For outstanding contribution to the development of Jewish cinema in Russia" — Alexander Mitta

Partners
 Federation of Jewish Communities of Russia
 Jewish Museum and Tolerance Center
 Genesis Philanthropy Group
 The network of cinemas "Karo"
 Jewish Agency for Israel
 UJA-Federation of New York
 Roskino
 Ark Pictures

See also
Ekaterinburg Jewish Film Festival

References

External links 
 Official website

Jewish film festivals in Europe
Film festivals in Russia
2016 film festivals
2016 in Russian cinema